Blair Imani (born Blair Elizabeth Brown, October 31, 1993) is an American author, historian, and activist. She identifies as queer, Black, bisexual and Muslim. She is a member of the Black Lives Matter movement, and is known for protesting the shooting of Alton Sterling and Executive Order 13769.

Education and career
Imani graduated from Louisiana State University (LSU) in 2015.

In 2014, during her time at LSU, Imani founded an organization called Equality for HER (Health Education Resources). Equality for HER is a non-profit that provides resources and a forum for women and nonbinary people to feel empowered. In 2016, she worked as a Press Officer for Planned Parenthood Action Fund. She also worked as the Civic Action & Campaign Lead at DoSomething, a tech company for young people and social change.

Imani is the author of Modern HERstory: Stories of Women and Nonbinary People Rewriting History, published by Ten Speed Press on October 16, 2018. The book is illustrated by Monique Le and "spotlights 70 overlooked but important people of color, queer people, trans people, disabled people, and more who are changing the world this very moment."

She is also the author of the illustrated history book Making Our Way Home: The Great Migration and the Black American Dream, published in January 2020. It is illustrated by Rachelle Baker and teaches about the Great Migration, black history, and "how privilege shows up in the way that we even depict black stories."

In September 2020, Imani launched "Smarter In Seconds", a series of informational videos on Instagram Reels around topics such as consent, discrimination, and environmental protection.

Activism in Baton Rouge

On July 10, 2016, in the aftermath of the shooting of Alton Sterling, Imani took part in a protest in Baton Rouge, Louisiana. While protesting, she and her partner Akeem Muhammad were arrested. In an interview with The Intercept, Imani detailed her encounter with Baton Rouge SWAT officers. She claimed that she was trampled and threatened verbally. She was photographed screaming as she was carried away by special force officers.

While being detained, she alleges one officer ordered: "really give it to her," and that another officer removed her hijab.

Less than a week after her arrest, Imani helped organize a vigil with the Louisiana State University Student Body Association in response to and in honor of the murder of three Baton Rouge police officers. In an article in The Advocate, she said, "All violence is wrong," and that she is against all brutality, including violence against police officers.

Personal life
After feelings of discomfort in Christian churches, Blair found solace and converted to Islam in 2015. During the Black Lives Matter protests following the 2015 Chapel Hill Shooting, Imani decided to contact nearby mosques to fight for both Black lives and the rights and safety of Muslims in America, which eventually led to her conversion. She stated she would read the Quran which helped further her connection with God.

She changed her surname to Imani and explained that "Imani means 'my faith' and it's one of the days of Kwanzaa, it's also a Swahili word as well as an Arabic word, and I felt like it encapsulated my journey to Islam." A year after converting she began wearing the hijab, but briefly stopped wearing it following the 2016 presidential election as a precaution for her own safety.

Imani came out as queer in June 2017 while making an appearance on Tucker Carlson Tonight. During the program, she spoke about fighting for communities, one of which was the LGBTQ community, when she was interrupted. The host, Tucker Carlson, stated "You're not here to speak on behalf of those communities." Blair responded "Well, Tucker Carlson, in addition to being a Muslim woman, I am a black, queer person." The announcement received both positive and negative reactions afterwards including death threats and words of encouragement. After coming out, she said she received support "from queer Muslims and young people all over the world" and that she found solace in the representation of LGBT Muslims on The Bold Type.

Works

References

External links

Personal website

1993 births
Living people
Black Lives Matter people
African-American activists
African-American Muslims
Place of birth missing (living people)
LGBT Muslims
LGBT African Americans
African-American writers
Converts to Islam
Queer writers
Queer women
American LGBT rights activists
American Muslim activists
Louisiana State University alumni
21st-century American women
Women civil rights activists
21st-century African-American women
21st-century LGBT people